Singapore participated in the 2011 Asian Winter Games in Almaty and Astana, Kazakhstan from January 30, 2011 to February 6, 2011. This marks Singapore's debut at a major winter sporting event. The nation sent only one athlete.

Short track speed skating

Men

References

Nations at the 2011 Asian Winter Games
Asian Winter Games
Singapore at the Asian Winter Games